The Party for Zeeland (PvZ) is a political party in the province of Zeeland in the Netherlands. It is one of the largest independent provincial political parties of the Netherlands, and arose through an alliance between the ZVP (Zeeuwsch Vlaamsche Volkspartij) and a number of local municipal political parties.

Electoral performance

References

External links
Official website

Regionalist parties in the Netherlands
Politics of Zeeland